Jake Wilson may refer to:

Jake Wilson (actor) in Citadel (film)
Jake Wilson, character in Along the Great Divide

See also
Jacob Wilson (disambiguation)